Forced Alliance: The Glarious Mandate is an action simulation video game, developed by American studio Orbital Games and published by Ripcord Games.

Gameplay
Forced Alliance is an action simulation video game.

Development
Forced Alliance was developed by Orbital Games and published by Ripcord Games.

Orbital Games originally had a working project codenamed Alien Alliance around 1995, that looked similar in visual and interface designs to Forced Alliance. It was also planned to come on the PlayStation. That former game was likely reworked and released as the latter game, exclusively for the PC.

Reception

Forced Alliance received mixed reception from video game critics.

References

External links
 

1997 video games
Ripcord Games games
Single-player video games
Space combat simulators
Video games developed in the United States
Windows games
Windows-only games